Major-General Joseph Walton (died 1808) was Master Gunner, St James's Park, the most senior Ceremonial Post in the Royal Artillery after the Sovereign.

Military career
Walton was commissioned into the Royal Artillery and was sent to North America where he was serving under General Thomas Gage in 1764.

He held the position of Master Gunner, St James's Park from 1783 and of Colonel of the Invalid Battalion from 1793. He was promoted to Major-General in 1802 and died in 1808.

References

1808 deaths
Royal Artillery officers
British Army generals
Year of birth missing
British Army personnel of the American Revolutionary War